North County High School may refer to:

North County High School (Glen Burnie, Maryland),
North County High School (Missouri), St. Francois County, Missouri